Sandra Espinet (born October 31, 1964 in Trinidad and Tobago) is a luxury interior designer who resides in and has  offices in both San José del Cabo, Mexico and Los Angeles, California.

Sandra is an HGTV personality, and has appeared on episodes of Bang for Your Buck, Halloween Block Party 2010, HGTV'd''' and HGTV’s Celebrity Holiday Homes on the which she completed the homes of Holly Robinson Peete in 2009, Brooke Burke and David Charvet in 2010 and Eva LaRue and Alison Sweeney in 2011.

Sandra is an ASID member and was the first place 2011 Design Excellence award winner for a home over 35,000 sq. ft. In December 2016 she was nominated one of the "top 10 interior designers in Latin America" by Architectural Digest Mexico,  December 2016 Sandra was also named one of the top 100 Interior Designers in Mexico by Ambientes Magazine,  In 2014 Sandra was a style ambassador for California Faucets, In 2014 to present she is on the K+BB editorial advisory board,  Since 2011 Sandra has been the China style ambassador for Anderson Wood Floor ( a Berkshire Hathaway Company), In 2010 she was voted as the “California Home and Design Designer of the Year”. In 2014 she designed and launched a  line of Tibetan rugs with “Aga John Rug Company” in Los Angeles.

Espinet's first book The Well-Traveled Home'' was published on August 1, 2013.  and she is currently working on her second book with publisher Gibbs-Smith.

Education
Sandra received her Associate in Arts at the New England School of Design in Boston MA, her Bachelor of Arts in interior design from the American College of Art in Atlanta, and has a master's degree in production design from the American Film Institute in Los Angeles.

See also

Interior designer
List of interior designers

References

Living people
1964 births
American interior designers
Participants in American reality television series
AFI Conservatory alumni
American women interior designers
21st-century American women